Anna Cornelia Jakobsdotter Samuelsson (born 9 March 1992), known professionally as Cornelia Jakobs, is a Swedish singer and songwriter. 
She is best known for representing Sweden in the Eurovision Song Contest 2022 with the song "Hold Me Closer", placing fourth in the final.

Biography

Early life
Jakobs was born in Nacka Municipality, Stockholm County, and grew up in Stockholm. The daughter of the Poodles' singer Jakob Samuel and Fia Lönnborn, she first entered music by auditioning for Idol 2008; she received some media attention after being mocked by the judges.

2011–2021: Love Generation and songwriting

She started her music career as a member of the girl group Love Generation, who participated in Melodifestivalen 2011 and 2012.

In 2020, Jakobs composed and performed the song "Weight of the World" which became the soundtrack for the HBO Nordic series . She participated in Melodifestivalen 2021 as a songwriter for the song "Best of Me" performed by Efraim Leo.

2022–present: Melodifestivalen and Eurovision
In 2022, Jakobs went solo as a singer and participated in Melodifestivalen 2022 with the song "Hold Me Closer", which qualified for the final and later won with 146 points, thus earning her the right to represent Sweden in the Eurovision Song Contest 2022 in Turin. In the final she finished in fourth place overall, with 438 points.

Discography

Singles

Awards

Notes

References

External links 

 

1992 births
Living people
Melodifestivalen winners
21st-century Swedish women singers
Singers from Stockholm
Eurovision Song Contest entrants for Sweden
Eurovision Song Contest entrants of 2022
Melodifestivalen contestants of 2022
Melodifestivalen contestants of 2012
Melodifestivalen contestants of 2011